Ilya Iosifovich Klebanov (born 7 May 1951 in Leningrad) is a Russian politician. He was the Plenipotentiary Presidential Envoy to the Northwestern Federal District of the Russian Federation .

Early offices 
Klebanov graduated in 1974 from the M.I. Kalinin Polytechnical Institute in Leningrad where he majored in electrical engineering. After graduating, he moved up through the ranks of the Leningrad Optics and Mechanics Association (LOMO) in St. Petersburg, leaving in 1997 after spending 7 years as its Director.

From 1997 to 1998, he worked in the Saint Petersburg City Administration as a First Deputy Governor with responsibility for the economy and industrial policy. Klebanov was appointed the Deputy Prime Minister of the Russian Federation responsible for Military Industries in May 1998. He was instructed to reform the arms industry while in this post. However, when he tried to reduce the industry's 170 organisations, he was met with strong opposition.

Kursk rescue and inquiry 

On 14 August 2000, as vice-premier, President Putin put him in charge of the Kursk rescue operation following its disastrous sinking. On 29 or 20 August, he announced that the likely cause of the sinking was a "strong 'dynamic external impact' corresponding with 'first event'", probably a collision with a foreign submarine or a large surface ship, or striking a World War II mine. This later proved to be completely unfounded. In February 2002, Putin designated Klebanov as Minister of Industry, Science and Technology. This move was seen as a demotion by many.

On 1 November 2003 he was chosen to be the Presidential Envoy to the Northwestern Federal District. It has been suggested that this was part of a long running campaign to bring the Northern capital closer to Moscow.

References

Further reading 
 KLEBANOV, Ilya Iosifovich International Who's Who. accessed 4 September 2006.

External links

Biography of Ilya Klebanov
Biography on St. Petersburg city website

1951 births
Living people
Russian Jews
Peter the Great St. Petersburg Polytechnic University alumni
Medvedev Administration personnel
Deputy heads of government of the Russian Federation
1st class Active State Councillors of the Russian Federation